Māris Diļevka (born March 3, 1992) is a Latvian professional ice hockey player. He is currently playing for HK Liepājas Metalurgs of the Belarusian Extraleague.

He participated at the 2012 World Junior Ice Hockey Championships as a member of the Latvia men's national junior ice hockey team.

References

1992 births
Living people
HK Liepājas Metalurgs players
Latvian ice hockey forwards
Ice hockey people from Riga